WTKX-FM (101.5 MHz) is an active rock music formatted radio station licensed to serve Pensacola, Florida.  The broadcast area reaches far into northwest Florida, nearly all of southwest Alabama and as far as Kiln, Mississippi.

In November 2014 the station studio's and broadcast center was moved to in Mobile, Alabama to be consolidated with other iHeartMedia facilities. In early 2020, WTKX opened a downtown Pensacola office and studios.

WTKX features syndicated personalities "Lex & Terry" in morning drive.

The station broadcasts in HD Radio and formerly carried "Hit Nation Junior" on its HD2 sub-channel.

WTKX has been a rock radio station for over 43 years as it was first established as TK-101 in 1978.  The station was sold to ClearChannel in 1996, ending its run as an independent station programmed in-house.

Local on-air personalities and alumni include: APD/MD "Mark The Shark" Dyba (deceased 2019), PD/OM Joel Sampson, Candy Cullerton (now AM Drive at WYCT-FM Pensacola), Steve Smith, PD Strummer, Linda J, Greg Golden, Dave Collins, Bedpan Andy, Rick Allen, Scott Free, Nick At Nite, Rory Suchet, Mike Ondako, Scotty, Suzy Boe, Alex, Lalaine, Linda Lawrence, Elvis Jones, Nick Flynn, Dick Danger, Gus Brandt, and Jon Stewart, Jeffrey Stevens, and Chip Nelson a.k.a. The Breakfast Flakes.
Current Program Director and PM Drive host is Brian "Crash" Edwards (2018–present)

References

External links

TKX
Active rock radio stations in the United States
IHeartMedia radio stations
1971 establishments in Florida
Radio stations established in 1971